Light as a Feather  is the second studio album by jazz fusion band Return to Forever led by pianist Chick Corea.

Content 
The style of the music remains mostly the same as the first album, though vocals were given a larger role. Corea produced the album for Polydor Records. Stanley Clarke played double bass, though for most of his career he has played bass guitar.

"Captain Marvel" is a fast Latin piece that provided the name for Stan Getz's album released in the same year (with Corea, Clarke, and Moreira also on the Getz album). Airto Moreira plays percussion and Purim sings without words during the song's main riff.

The album ends with "Spain", which was inspired by, and whose introduction was taken from, Joaquín Rodrigo's Concierto de Aranjuez (1939).

It would be the last album to feature the line up of the first two records of the band with the exception of bassist Stanley Clarke who has remained with the band for all of its existence, saxophonist Joe Farrell, singer Flora Purim and her husband, drummer Airto Moreira, left after its release and were replaced by guitarist Bill Connors and drummer Lenny White. Although saxophonist Joe Farrell would return with the band on their seventh and eighth albums Musicmagic and Live.

Reception and legacy 
Light as a Feather won the 1972 Playboy Jazz Album of the year and has been selected by many magazines and polls as one of the greatest jazz albums ever recorded. For many years this album has been listed on The Absolute Sound super disc list and the Stereophile list of "Records to Die For". It is also featured in Tom Moon's 1,000 Albums to Hear Before You Die.

Track listing

Personnel 
 Chick Corea – Fender Rhodes electric piano
 Stanley Clarke – double bass
 Flora Purim – vocals (CD1: 1–4, 6; CD2: 2, 3, 5–10), percussion
 Joe Farrell – flute, soprano saxophone, tenor saxophone
 Airto Moreira – drums, percussion

Chart performance

References

External links 
 Return to Forever Light as a Feather (1973) album review by Michael G. Nastos, credits & releases at AllMusic
 Return to Forever Light as a Feather (1973) album releases & credits at Discogs
 Return to Forever Light as a Feather (1973) album credits & user reviews at ProgArchives.com
 Return to Forever Light as a Feather (1973, Remastered 1998 2CD with Bonus Alternative Takes) album to be listened as stream on Spotify

1973 albums
Polydor Records albums
Return to Forever albums
Albums recorded at IBC Studios